Banatska Subotica is a village in Serbia. It is located in the Bela Crkva municipality, in the South Banat District, Vojvodina province. The village has a Serb ethnic majority (85%) and a population of 200 (2002 census).

Historical population

1961: 505
1971: 479
1981: 372
1991: 280

References
Slobodan Ćurčić, Broj stanovnika Vojvodine, Novi Sad, 1996.

See also
List of places in Serbia
List of cities, towns and villages in Vojvodina

Populated places in Serbian Banat
Populated places in South Banat District
Bela Crkva